Ugalla is a small town and ward in Mlele District of Katavi Region, Tanzania, East Africa. The town is on the left (west) bank of the Mtambo River just before it flows into the Ugalla River, on the edge of the Lujaba Swamp.

Villages
In addition to the town of Ugalla, the ward contains the following villages: 

 Iseka
 Kamini
 Kankusha
 Kasisi (A & B)
 Kasulo
 Katamike 
 Lyogelo 
 Mjimwema
 Mnyamasi (A & B)
 Mtambalala
 Sikwisi
 Uvuvini
 Vigaeni
 Mihawa
 Mihama saba
 Utemini

References

Populated places in Katavi Region